This article details the fixtures and results of the Armenia national football team in the 1990s (between 1992 and 1999).

1992-1994

1995

1996

1997

1998

1999

References

 
 

1992
football team results
Foo
1994 in Armenian football
1995 in Armenian football
1996 in Armenian football
1997 in Armenian football
1998 in Armenian football
1999 in Armenian football